National Wrestling Alliance (NWA) is an American professional wrestling promotion operating via its parent company Lightning One, Inc. Title reigns are either determined by professional wrestling matches or are awarded to a wrestler, as a result of the culmination of various scripted storylines, following is correct as of  , .

The promotion currently has eight championships - four men's singles titles, two men's tag team championships, one women's singles title, and a women's tag team championship. The list includes the number of times the wrestler has held the title, the date and location of the win, and a description of the winning bout.

Overview

Men 
At the top of the National Wrestling Alliance's championship hierarchy is the NWA Worlds Heavyweight Championship. The championship is currently held by first time champion Tyrus, who defeated previous champion Trevor Murdoch and Matt Cardona in a Three-way match on November 12, 2022 at Hard Times 3 to win the title.

The secondary title is the NWA National Championship. Cyon is the current champion in his first reign, defeating Jax Dane on August 27, 2022 during Night 1 of the NWA 74th Anniversary Show to win the title.

Next is the NWA World Television Championship, which is currently held by first time title holder Jordan Clearwater, who defeated  who defeated AJ Cazana for the vacated title on November 12, 2022 at Hard Times 3. Previous champion Tyrus had voluntarily vacated the title by invoking his "Lucky 7" clause to challenge for the NWA Worlds Heavyweight Championship.

The NWA World Junior Heavyweight Championship is for wrestlers 220 lbs. and under. Kerry Morton  is the current champion in his first reign. He defeated  Homicide on November 12, 2022 at Hard Times 3 to win the title.

The NWA World Tag Team Championship is held by two-time champions La Rebelión (Bestia 666 and Mecha Wolf 450). They defeated Hawx Aerie (Luke Hawx and PJ Hawx) on Night One of the NWA 74th Anniversary Show on August 27, 2022  to win the vacant titles after previous champions The Commonwealth Connection (Doug Williams and Harry Smith) had to vacate the titles due to Smith being unable to defend them because of an illness.

The NWA United States Tag Team Championship is held by The Fixers (Jay Bradley and Wrecking Ball Legursky), who became inaugural champions by winning a 12 team battle royal on August 28, 2022 at the NWA 74th Anniversary Show.

Women 

The newly created secondary womans Championship is the NWA Women's Television Championship. Its creation was announced on the July 26, 2022 episode of NWA Power yet no further details have been announced on how a champion will be crowned or where.

The top championship for female tag teams is the NWA World Women's Tag Team Championship, which is held by first-time champions Pretty Empowered (Ella Envy and Kenzie Paige), who defeated The Hex (Allysin Kay and Marti Belle) on June 11, 2022 at NWA Alwayz Ready to win the titles.

Current champions

Men's division
Singles

Tag team

Women's division
Singles

Tag team

See also
List of National Wrestling Alliance personnel

Notes

References

External links
 Official NWA website
 Official NWA YouTube channel	
 Official NWA Facebook page

Champions
 
Professional wrestling champion lists